Meshack Jeremiah Opulukwa (born 27 July 1967) is a Tanzanian CHADEMA politician and Member of Parliament for Meatu constituency since 2010.

References

1967 births
Living people
Chadema MPs
Tanzanian MPs 2010–2015